Chao Hsiu-wa is a Taiwanese politician.

She served on the Taiwan Provincial Council 1973 to 1981 and was affiliated with the tangwai movement. Chao's 1977 reelection campaign was noted for criticisms of Wang Yu-yun. She contested a party primary in August 1992, and subsequently won election to the Legislative Yuan, representing the Democratic Progressive Party between 1993 and 1996.

References

Living people
Year of birth missing (living people)
20th-century Taiwanese politicians
20th-century Taiwanese women politicians
Members of the 2nd Legislative Yuan
Party List Members of the Legislative Yuan
Democratic Progressive Party Members of the Legislative Yuan